The 1879 Boston mayoral election saw  Frederick O. Prince reelected to his third overall term.

Results

See also
List of mayors of Boston, Massachusetts

References

Mayoral elections in Boston
Boston
Boston mayoral
19th century in Boston